The Men's 200 metre butterfly competition of the swimming events at the 2015 World Aquatics Championships was held on 4 August with the heats and the semifinals and 5 August with the final.

Records
Prior to the competition, the existing world and championship records were as follows.

Results

Heats
The heats were held at 10:15.

Semifinals
The semifinals were held on 4 August at 19:04.

Semifinal 1

Semifinal 2

Final

The final was held at 17:52.

References

Men's 200 metre butterfly